S.L. Mestrezat was a Democratic Associate Justice of the Supreme Court of Pennsylvania. He was elected in 1901, and was from Uniontown, Pennsylvania

References

People from Uniontown, Pennsylvania
Justices of the Supreme Court of Pennsylvania